Cirsium brevistylum is a species of thistle known by the common names Indian thistle and clustered thistle. It is native to western North America having been found in southwestern British Columbia, Washington, Oregon, Idaho, Montana, and California.

Cirsium brevistylum grows in moist areas in many types of habitat, from mountain forests to chaparral and coastal marshes. This native thistle is annual or biennial, reaching  in height and known to exceed  at times. There is usually a single stem which may branch toward the top and is coated in hairs and webby fibers. The leaves are deeply cut into many lobes lined with twisted teeth, the longest leaves near the base of the plant reaching about 25 centimeters long. The leaves are borne on winged petioles with many spines. The inflorescence bears one to many flower heads, both at the ends of the stem branches and in the leaf axils. The flower head reaches about 3 centimeters long by 4 wide and is lined with cobwebby, bristly, spine-tipped phyllaries. The flower head is packed with white or pink flowers about 2 centimeters long. The fruit is a brown achene a few millimeters long topped with a pappus one to two centimeters in length.

Gallery

References

External links
Jepson Manual Treatment
Calphotos Photo gallery, University of California

brevistylum
Plants described in 1953
Flora of the Western United States
Flora of British Columbia
Flora without expected TNC conservation status
Taxa named by Arthur Cronquist